

World Circus is the debut studio album of the thrash metal band Toxik. It was released in 1987 on Roadrunner Records. The album was re-released by Metal Mind Productions and Displeased Records in 2007.

Track listing

Personnel
Mike Sanders - Vocals
Josh Christian - Guitars 
Brian Bonini - Bass
Tad Leger - Drums

References

Toxik albums
1987 debut albums
Albums with cover art by Ed Repka
Roadrunner Records albums